Craig Benjamin Wedren (born August 15, 1969) is an American singer-songwriter, musician and composer, who began his career fronting post-hardcore band Shudder to Think. Following the disbandment of Shudder to Think, Wedren pursued a career as a television and film music composer, as well as releasing solo material.

Career
Wedren began his career as the singer and primary songwriter for Washington, DC-based Shudder to Think, a band that started out in the hardcore music scene, only to challenge the aesthetics and limitations of this then-emerging musical genre. After breaking indie music tradition by signing with Epic Records (Sony Music), Shudder to Think released three major label albums including their opus Pony Express Record. Shudder to Think toured widely with bands like Smashing Pumpkins, Fugazi, and Pearl Jam, and their videos were featured in regular rotation on MTV. At the peak of their career, a battle with Hodgkin's Disease grounded Wedren and the band, but following successful treatments Shudder to Think returned with a new goal in mind – to create music for film. With Shudder to Think, Wedren scored the independent films First Love Last Rites, and High Art, and contributed music to the film Velvet Goldmine. Shortly after making the transition to film work, the band dissolved their partnership, and Wedren continued his dual career as both film composer and solo artist.

As a composer, Wedren has scored a host of popular feature films including Wanderlust, Role Models, School of Rock, Wet Hot American Summer, By the People: The Election of Barack Obama, Laurel Canyon, Reno 911!: Miami, Roger Dodger, The Baxter, and Boxers and Ballerinas. Wedren has also written and performed music for the television shows Hung, United States of Tara, Reno 911!, Stella, The State, The Whitest Kids U' Know, Dawson's Creek, Bones and Don't Trust the B---- in Apartment 23.

In 2004 Wedren released a recording by his band BABY, which was in an electronic dance vein, but distinguished by glam and pop sensibilities.

While continuing to grow creatively and commercially as a composer, Wedren has also developed a career as a solo artist. In 2005 he released his first solo album Lapland on the Team Love label, after which he toured supporting Foo Fighters, and Greg Dulli of Afghan Whigs. In September 2011, Wedren released Wand. To accompany the release of Wand, Wedren toured the United States with Chris Cornell, and he worked with director Tim Nackashi to create a series of 360-degree interactive videos.

In 2012, Wedren re-released recordings by his band BABY. The release included previously unreleased demos, and mixes, as well as a mixed tape which includes covers, and other unreleased material.

Wedren has also contributed vocals to the musical act Tweaker with Chris Vrenna, formerly of Nine Inch Nails, The Verve Pipe's self-titled album, the musical act Cex, The Dead Science's album Villainaire and Someone To Run Away From with Pocket, Jherek Bischoff, and a Fleetwood Mac cover with St. Vincent on Fleetwood Mac Tribute record Just Tell Me That You Want Me.

Wedren wrote the theme for and was a regular extra on MTV's The State and was close friends with many members of the show. Wedren also played a part in 2009's I Love You, Man as a member of the wedding band, as well a role in David Wain's 2012 film Wanderlust.

Wedren also wrote and performed the title track for the movie Balls of Fury. Additionally, he wrote the song "Bondage" for the movie soundtrack.

In 2021, Wedren and Anna Waronker collaborated on the soundtrack to Showtime's Yellowjackets. The original theme song No Return, for the opening credits, was composed by the duo, alongside the score for the show. They also collaborated on the soundtrack for Hulu's Shrill in 2019.

Personal life
Wedren was diagnosed with Hodgkin's Lymphoma in 1995. He successfully fought the disease and, after several years of treatments, remains in remission. He has been married to Meggan Lennon since 2006 and they share a son.

Discography
Lapland (2005 · Team Love Records)
The Spanish Amnesian (2009)
WAND (2011)
Adult Desire (2017)

References

External links
Craig Wedren official website
Team Love Records

Spin interview
 https://www.vanityfair.com/style/2019/03/singer-craig-wedrens-polaroids-are-proto-instagrams-of-the-indie-90s
 https://variety.com/2022/music/news/yellowjackets-theme-song-composers-craig-wedren-anna-waronker-1235155037/

1969 births
Living people
Shudder to Think members
Team Love Records artists
The Field School alumni
American rock guitarists
American male guitarists
American rock songwriters
American rock singers
Alternative rock singers
Alternative rock guitarists
American indie rock musicians
American punk rock guitarists
American punk rock singers
American film score composers
American male film score composers
American alternative rock musicians
American television composers
Guitarists from Washington, D.C.
20th-century American guitarists
20th-century American male musicians
American male singer-songwriters
Singer-songwriters from Washington, D.C.